Gangala-na-Bodio was a colonial-era elephant-domestication station located in Gangala-na-Bodio, near Faradje in present-day Democratic Republic of the Congo. The Belgian project at Kira Vunga, Api and Gangala was the first attempt to domesticate African elephants for work.

Notes

References

Orientale Province
Belgian colonisation in Africa
Elephant conservation
Nature conservation in the Democratic Republic of the Congo
Protected areas established in 1974
1974 establishments in Zaire
Haut-Uélé